In computational number theory, Marsaglia's theorem connects modular arithmetic and analytic geometry to describe the flaws with the pseudorandom numbers resulting from a linear congruential generator. As a direct consequence, it is now widely considered that linear congruential generators are weak for the purpose of generating random numbers. Particularly, it is inadvisable to use them for simulations with the Monte Carlo method or in cryptographic settings, such as issuing a public key certificate, unless specific numerical requirements are satisfied. Poorly chosen values for the modulus and multiplier in a Lehmer random number generator will lead to a short period for the sequence of random numbers. Marsaglia's result may be further extended to a mixed linear congruential generator.

Main statement
Consider a Lehmer random number generator with 

 

for any modulus  and multiplier  where each , and define a sequence

 

Define the points

 

With such a multiplicative number generator, all -tuples of resulting random numbers lie in at most  hyperplanes. Additionally, for a choice of constants  which satisfy the congruence

 

there are at most  parallel hyperplanes which contain all -tuples produced by the generator. Proofs for these claims may be found in Marsaglia's original paper.

References

Theorems in number theory
Random number generation